Abnormality was an American death metal band from Boston, Massachusetts. Formed in 2005 from various acts such as Sexcrement, Forced Asphyxiation, Goratory, Parasitic Extirpation and Iranach, the band has released three studio albums, Contaminating The Hive Mind, Mechanisms Of Omniscience and Sociopathic Constructs as well as EP The Collective Calm in Mortal Oblivion.  In 2015, the quintet signed with Metal Blade Records.

History 
In 2005, Abnormality formed from various bands, creating debut EP The Collective Calm in Mortal Oblivion five years later.

In June 2012, the band released Contaminating The Hive Mind, their debut studio album.  In April of the following year, the group published a music video for "Fabrication Of The Enemy".

In October 2015, the band announced that they were working on their second studio album with producer Pete Rutcho. In 2016, the band announced the title of the work as Mechanisms Of Omniscience, releasing three songs from that album.

In April and May 2016, the band toured with Battlecross, Soulfly, Suffocation and Lody Kong.

In November 2020, the band announced they had broken up.

Critical reception 
Brave Words & Bloody Knuckles described the ensemble as "Marrying the ceaseless brutality coming out of New York and New England to the hyper-blasting intensity endemic to Quebecois death metal", going on to state that Mechanisms Of Omniscience is "as unrelenting as it is passionate" and that the album "tackles real world issues with intelligence and raw emotion".

Metalsucks describes the song "Cymatic Hallucinations" as "if Abnormality took all the best elements of modern tech-death, mashed it up with the old school variety, infused it with a sense of groove rarely felt in metal’s more technical corners and created one seething, roaring, fire-breathing death metal beast".

Blabbermouth describes debut album Contaminating The Hive Mind as "cementing their status as one of the heaviest and most dynamic bands in the [extreme metal] genre".

Members
Final
 Mallika Sundaramurthy – vocals (2005–2020)
 Jeremy Henry – rhythm guitar (2005–2020)
 Jay Blaisdell – drums (2005–2020)
 Josh Staples – bass (2009–2020)
 Sam Kirsch – lead guitar (2015–2020)

Former
 Michael O'Meara – lead guitar (2005–2009)
 Shawn MacDonald – bass (2005–2008)
 Ben Durgin – lead guitar (2010–2014)

Timeline

Discography
Studio albums
 Contaminating the Hive Mind  (2012)
 Mechanisms of Omniscience  (2016)
Sociopathic Constructs (2019)

Demos/EPs
2007 Demo (2007)
 The Collective Calm in Mortal Oblivion (2010)
'' Curb Stomp (Single) (2019)

References

Extreme metal musical groups
Heavy metal musical groups from Massachusetts
Musical groups established in 2005
Musical groups from Boston
Musical quintets
Metal Blade Records artists